The Geneva trolleybus system  forms part of the public transport network in Geneva, Switzerland.  It is the second largest trolleybus system in Switzerland, after the Lausanne system.

Opened in 1942, the system supplements the Geneva tramway network.  It is operated by Transports publics genevois (TPG), and currently also serves the neighbouring municipalities of Bernex, Cologny, Confignon, Le Grand-Saconnex, Lancy, Meyrin, Onex and Vernier.

History
Geneva's first trolleybus line, inaugurated on 11 September 1942, linked Champel with Le Petit-Saconnex, replacing the former tram line.  Like the tramway network, it was operated by the Compagnie Genevoise des Tramways Électriques (CGTE).  In subsequent years, other tram lines were closed and replaced with trolleybus lines:

in 1950, line 4;
in 1959, line 6;
in 1961, line 2.

Additionally, two trolleybus lines replaced former bus lines:
 in 1950, line 7 to Aïre;
 in 1959, line 33 to Cointrin.

In 1971, line 4 was closed.  In 1976, the name of the operator, CGTE, was changed to Transports Publics Genevois (TPG).  On 25 September 1989, line 5 was merged into line 6.  For more than a decade, some services on the extended line 6 were operated by conventional buses (fully trolleybus line 26 was supporting it till Châtelaine), but on 24 June 2001 the line reverted to operation solely by trolleybuses.

Lines 
Since the reorganisation of Geneva's tram and trolleybus lines on 11 December 2011, the trolleybus lines have been as follows:

Fleet

Current fleet 
Geneva's present trolleybus fleet consists of 94 articulated and ten bi-articulated vehicles:

Past fleet 
The following table summarises Geneva's former trolleybuses:

A number of Geneva's former trolleybuses, fleet nos. 32, 96, 602–605, 607, 611–613, 615–617, 621, 643 and 644, were exported to Chile in the early 1990s. Some of these exported vehicles remained in service on the Valparaíso trolleybus system for many more years, the last two being withdrawn in 2013 and 2014.

The unique NAW/Hess bi-articulated vehicle, fleet no. 721, was created in autumn 2003, by adding a third body section to the 1993-built fleet no. 709 of type BGT-N. It was the first Swiss bi-articulated trolleybus and served as a prototype for the production vehicles of type BGGT-N2C.  All of the bi-articulated vehicles are used on line 10.

See also

List of trolleybus systems in Switzerland
Trams in Geneva

References

Specific

General

External links

 
 

Geneva
Geneva
Transport in Geneva
1942 establishments in Switzerland